One North Central Luzon (previously known as 24 Oras North Central Luzon/24 Oras Amianan/Balitang Amianan) is a Philippine news program of the GMA Regional TV in the North Central Luzon super region. The newscast delivers news and current affairs in Tagalog language. The news program is the first regional news program of GMA to be delivered in Tagalog, and the first in Luzon. Initially created to deliver news from North Central Luzon, the newscast expanded its coverage into Ilocos Region, Cordillera Administrative Region, Cagayan Valley and parts of Central Luzon as part of GMA Regional's plans to strengthen its local news division. Originally anchored by Jorge Guerrero, it premiered on May 5, 2008. CJ Torida, Joanne Ponsoy, Ivy Hernando and Harold Reyes currently serve as the anchors.

The newscast airs from Monday to Friday from 5:10 PM to 5:40 PM on GMA Dagupan (TV-10), GMA TV-5 Ilocos Norte, GMA TV-48 Ilocos Sur, GMA TV-7 Abra, GMA TV-5 Mountain Province, GMA TV-7 Tuguegarao, GMA TV-13 Aparri, GMA TV-7 Isabela, GMA TV-5 Baler, GMA TV-7 Batanes and GMA TV-10 Olongapo.

Balitang Amianan is also re-aired for national viewers under GTV’s late night block "Local News Matters: GMA Regional TV Strip" on a weekly basis. It airs every Monday at 11:50 PM from May 18, 2020 to July 19, 2021.

The program also airs worldwide on GMA News TV.

History

As Balitang Amianan (2008-2014)
It first aired on Channel 10 in Dagupan and anchored by former anchor for TV Patrol North Central Luzon/TV Patrol Ilocos (now TV Patrol North Luzon) and Dateline Northern Luzon (now defunct) Jorge Guerrero and the first set of news reporters namely Joyce Segui, CJ Torida, Alfie Tulagan and Charisse Victorio. In June 2012, Jorge Guerrero left the show and moved to GMA Ilocos to become the solo anchor of Balitang Ilokano (later 24 Oras Ilokano) and was replaced by CJ Torida. Co-anchor and reporter Joyce Segui joins Torida on the anchor team in 2013. The channel's biggest expose so far is about a casino which was established in Poro, San Fernando, La Union.

To strengthen its commitment of bringing the latest, most credible and most comprehensive news from the region, in July 2013, Balitang Amianan started its international broadcast on GMA News TV International alongside other newscasts Balitang Bisdak and 24 Oras Davao (now One Mindanao).

The newscast's first incarnation ended its 6-year run on November 7, 2014.

As 24 Oras North Central Luzon/24 Oras Amianan (2014-2016)
Following changes of its now-main newscast 24 Oras, Balitang Amianan was rebranded as 24 Oras North Central Luzon effective November 10, 2014.
 
On August 31, 2015, 24 Oras North Central Luzon retitled as 24 Oras Amianan (after Ratsada 24 Oras of GMA Iloilo since July 20, now relaunched since August 27, 2018 as One Western Visayas) with an additional segment called "Trivia ni Araguy". 24 Oras Amianan aired its last telecast on January 29, 2016.

As Balitang Amianan (2016-2022)
On February 1, 2016, Balitang Amianan returned on the air after more than a year hiatus. On April 18, 2016, Faye Centeno joined as Torida's co-anchor in the newscast.

Since October 3, 2016, Balitang Amianan started its simulcast on GMA TV-5 Ilocos Norte, GMA TV-48 Ilocos Sur, GMA TV-7 Abra and GMA TV-5 Mountain Province as it expands its coverage area to the northern areas of the Ilocos Region and some parts of the Cordillera Administrative Region and Central Luzon (Balitang Amianan already broadcast in selected areas of Central Luzon [Tarlac, majority Tagalog-speaking province of Nueva Ecija, and some places of Pampanga in particular] in the beginning of news program, which is the reason for using the Filipino language as its medium);  Central Luzon is a multicultural & multilingual region, with Tagalog/Filipino serving as a regional lingua franca & Ilocano as a main lingua franca in the northern areas of the region.

On January 2, 2017, the newscast updated its opening billboard and lower third graphics similar to 24 Oras, together with other newscasts Balitang Bisdak and One Mindanao.

Relaunch
On October 23, 2017, Balitang Amianan relaunched with a brand new set and segments (including the well-known Anto Tan?), as well as theme music and OBB, similar to its sister regional news program One Mindanao, GMA Regional TV's newscast for Mindanao stations, which was launched two months earlier. Longtime correspondent Joanne Ponsoy joined Torida and Centeno to anchor the newscast.

In July 2018, longtime reporter Jasmin Gabriel-Galban joined Torida and Ponsoy on the anchor team. She replaced Faye Centeno, who left the newscast.

On July 29, 2019, the newscast tweaks a minor revision of its titlecard, changing its font color to green, reflecting it with its co-produced national newscast GMA Regional TV Weekend News (later Regional TV Weekend News, now Regional TV News), which was launched on July 27. A week after, on August 5, 2019, Balitang Amianan updated their graphics and introduced new opening titles patterned with its co-produced national newscast (featuring the sceneries of the program's coverage area). The newscast had a more relaxed set-up with couches instead of the tables and chairs that viewers usually see on typical newscasts intending to be an extension of viewers' living room, further connecting the news anchors and the viewers.

On March 15, 2021, Balitang Amianan expands its simulcast on GMA TV-7 Tuguegarao, GMA TV-13 Aparri, GMA TV-7 Isabela, GMA TV-5 Baler, GMA TV-7 Batanes, and GMA TV-10 Olongapo as it expands its coverage area to Batanes, Cagayan, Isabela, Nueva Vizcaya, and other majority native Tagalog-speaking provinces of Aurora and Zambales. Three months later, on June 14, 2021, Balitang Amianan updated its opening billboard to reflect the addition of Cagayan Valley and the rest of Cordillera and Central Luzon (except for Bataan and Bulacan) to its coverage area.

From September 20 to November 9, 2021, Torida temporarily left the newscast while Gabriel-Galban returned to being a field reporter, leaving Ponsoy as a solo anchor until Torida returned. Co-anchor and Mornings with GMA Regional TV host Harold Reyes replaced Gabriel-Galban in the anchor team on February 25, 2022, once again reviving the three-anchor format for the newscast and three other regional newscasts.

The newscast started using the newly opened studio of the GMA Ilocos Sur Station on April 25, while in tandem also using the studio of the GMA Dagupan Station. Co-anchor-correspondent Ivy Hernando joined the anchor team on June 10, 2022.

As One North Central Luzon (2022-present)

On September 5, 2022, the newscast was rebranded to "GMA Regional TV One North Central Luzon" as part of the newscast expanding its coverage to  other Tagalog-speaking provinces of Bataan and Bulacan, being the third newscast to use the ONE brand, alongside One Mindanao from GMA Davao, GMA Cagayan de Oro, GMA Zamboanga and  GMA General Santos and One Western Visayas from GMA Bacolod and GMA Iloilo. Less than a year since the relaunch, the program started using the studio of the GMA Ilocos Norte Station on March 6, 2023, CJ Torida transferred from GMA Dagupan to GMA Ilocos Norte.

Personalities

Anchors
 CJ Torida - Dagupan (now Ilocos Norte) main anchor and senior desk manager 
 Joanne Ponsoy - Dagupan co-anchor, correspondent and news producer
 Ivy Hernando - Ilocos Sur correspondent and co-anchor
 Harold Reyes - Dagupan co-anchor

Correspondents 
 Glam Calicdan-Dizon - Senior Program Manager
 Jerick James Pasiliao - Supervising Producer
 Jasmin Gabriel-Galban - Dagupan, Tarlac, Pampanga, Nueva Ecija and Aurora correspondent
 Russel Simorio - Dagupan, Nueva Ecija, Aurora and Cagayan Valley correspondent
 Claire Lacanilao - Dagupan, Nueva Ecija and Baguio correspondent

Former personalities
 Jorge Guererro
 Joyce Segui
 Faye Centeno
 Jessica Manwi-it† - (died in June 2016)
 Charmaine Alvarado
 Lilian Bautista-Tiburcio
 Mike Sabado
 Hazel Cawaing
 Jeeson Alamar
 Peha Lagao
 Charisse Victorio
 Shiela Mae Finuliar
 Anthony Ron Allister "Ka Tonying" Tañedo a.k.a. Araguy - Trivia ni Araguy segment host
 Michael Sison
 Jette Arcellana - (now a lawyer)
 Alfie Tulagan
 Kim Bandarlipe (Political Run For 2022 Elections) - Now a municipal councilor
 King Guevarra
 Maureen Dalope-Galapon - former Program Manager
 Marjorie Padua - Supervising Producer
 Dennis Alipio - Ilocos Norte correspondent; formerly with the now-defunct 24 Oras Ilokano
 Vic Alhambra - La Union correspondent
 Junjun Sy - Nueva Ecija correspondent
 Ronald Leander - Aurora correspondent
 Tere Sundayon - Ilocos Sur correspondent and news producer
 Trace Justine De Leon - Supervising Producer

Segments
 Blotter (Police Reports)
 Bantay Panahon (Weather Reports)
 Bantay Bagyo (Typhoon Reports)
 Health Alert (Health Reports)
 Magkano? (Price Reports)
 May Trabaho Ka! (Job Reports)
 Hayop sa Balita (Animal Reports)
 Hulicam (Caught-on-Cam Reports)
 Laban Kontra Droga (Drug Reports)
 Balitang Barangay (Neighborhood Reports)
 Dengue Watch (Dengue Reports)
 Balitang Sports / Game On! (Sports Reports)
 Balitang Showbiz (Showbiz Reports)
 Extra (Features)
 Extra Income (Money Reports)
 Good News (Good Features)
 Campus News (Campus Reports)
 Kapuso Serbisyo (Public Service Reports)
 Kapuso Barangayan (Event Reports)
 Batang Amianan (Children Reports)
 GMA RTV Presents (Special Reports)
 #Spreadkindness (Profile Reports)
 Trip Natin/G na G! (Travel Reports)
 Kwento ng Pilipino (Story Reports)
 Anto Tan? (Questions)
 Mangan (Food Reports)
 'Yan ang Pinoy! (Talented Reports)
 Balitang Agri (Agri Reports)
 Fiesta! (Fiesta Reports)
 Ratsada Probinsya (Other Reports)
 I-Amianan Mo! (Problem Reports)
 Exclusive (Exclusive Reports)
 Hanepbuhay (Work Reports)
 Kapuso sa Kalikasan (Environmental Reports)
 Kapuso sa Pasko (Christmas Activity Feature Segment)

References 

2008 Philippine television series debuts
Flagship evening news shows
GMA Network news shows
GMA Integrated News and Public Affairs shows
Mass media in Dagupan
Philippine television news shows